Brian Leslie Howe AO (born 28 January 1936) is a retired Australian politician and Uniting Church minister. He served as Deputy Prime Minister of Australia and deputy leader of the Labor Party from 1991 to 1995, under Bob Hawke and Paul Keating. He was a government minister continuously from 1983 to 1996, and a member of the House of Representatives from 1977 to 1996, representing the Division of Batman in Victoria.

Early life
Howe was born in Melbourne. He grew up in the suburb of Malvern and attended Melbourne High School, going on to complete a Bachelor of Arts and a diploma in criminology at the University of Melbourne. He later moved to the United States to study at McCormick Theological Seminary in Chicago. Howe was the minister at a Methodist church in Fitzroy from 1961 to 1969, while lecturing part-time in sociology. He remains an ordained Uniting Church minister.

In the early 1970s, Howe was the founding director of the Centre for Urban Research and Action (CURA). This model of research and action was based on his experience studying in Chicago from 1965 to 1967, and particularly his involvement in the civil rights and anti-poverty movements. CURA participated in campaigns against major changes in inner city Melbourne, including homelessness, the demolition of housing for high-rise estates, freeway construction. It supported the rights of tenants, the marginalisation of ethnic groups, and the provision of social services.

Politics
Howe was elected to the House of Representatives at the 1977 federal election, representing the northern Melbourne metropolitan electoral Division of Batman. He defeated the incumbent Horrie Garrick for Labor preselection in a hard-fought preselection contest. It was reportedly the first occasion on which an incumbent Victorian Labor MP in a safe seat was defeated for preselection. A member of the Socialist Left faction of the Labor Party, Howe was Minister for Defence Support in the government of Bob Hawke from 1983. In 1984 he became Minister for Social Security and carried out various radical reforms to Australia's welfare system.

Howe appeared to face significant opposition within his electorate in 1988, when up to 60 members of the Greek Westgarth branch of the ALP defected to join the Australian Democrats. One of the defectors, tram-conductor George Gogas, contested Batman as a Democrat candidate in 1990, but polled only 12.9 per cent of the vote.

After the 1990 election Howe was appointed to the post of Minister for Community Services and Health. When Paul Keating resigned from the cabinet in 1991, Howe was elected deputy leader of the Labor Party in his place, defeating Graeme Campbell in a caucus ballot by 81 votes to 18. He was subsequently appointed Deputy Prime Minister. He became Minister for Health, Housing and Community Services in the Keating government in December 1991, dropping the health part of the portfolio in 1993. In June 1995 he resigned as Deputy Prime Minister and was succeeded by Kim Beazley. He remained in the House of Representatives until the 1996 election.

Howe's last months in the Deputy PM's role were marked by speculation that his successor would be, not Beazley, but Carmen Lawrence, the erstwhile Premier of Western Australia. At the time Lawrence enjoyed considerable popularity, and there were those in the ALP who hoped that with her as Deputy PM, the Keating government (then doing badly in the opinion polls) would benefit. This hope was dashed when Lawrence herself became the subject of a royal commission around the time Howe left the post, although she denied that the royal commission had been her reason for not seeking out the job. Kim Beazley was eventually elected as his successor.

Contribution 
Howe was an extremely active Minister with a strong sense of social justice, Radical reforms were implemented in social security, disability and other areas during his term of office.

Social security 
In February 1986 Howe instigated the Cass Social Security Review, which led to substantive restructuring of the social security system. Some of the most important changes were  

 providing positive incentives to reducing welfare dependence, especially education and training
 guaranteed indexation of benefits to cost-of-living
 ongoing monitoring and evaluation of all programmes
 removal of gender-based eligibility for payments
 rationalisation and fortnightly payments of most benefits.

The most important new payments were: 

 Family Allowance Supplement, which eventually incorporated all child-related programmes with far higher rates of payment than previously, and which incorporated Rent Allowance when applicable
 Jobsearch and Newstart, which replaced unemployment benefits and which required regular evidence of search for work.

Disability policy 
Howe’s tenure as Minister for Community Services from 1990-1994 coincided with a reorientation of disability policy to encourage disabled people to enter or remain in the formal workforce, enhancing and protecting the rights of people with disabilities and providing opportunities for them to contribute to wider society.

In 1991, Brian Howe was the responsible minister for the Disability Reform Package. which modified Commonwealth income support payments for people with disabilities to encourage their integration into the workforce. The package contained a large shift in emphasis toward 'open employment' as opposed to the existing special employment programs. Open Employment Services subsequently offered intensive and ongoing support to secure work for disabled people in the open market.

The first Commonwealth State Disability Agreement (CSDA) in 1991 clarified the roles and responsibilities of the governments. The Commonwealth was given responsibility for income support and employment services and the States and Territories were given responsibility for accommodation and other support services. According to Lindsay (1995), the 1991 agreement provided no extra resources and merely reaffirmed the status quo; but it did set in place a permanent mechanism whereby disability policy could be advanced.

Howe also introduced the Disability Discrimination Act 1992, which made disability discrimination unlawful and promoted equal rights, equal opportunity and equal access for people with disabilities. The Act empowered a Disability Discrimination Commissioner.

In 1994 the Commonwealth Disability Strategy set in place a consultative ten-year framework of action for Commonwealth departments and agencies to remove any barriers or discrimination in employment and program delivery.

Health 
In health policy, Howe established the National Mental Health Strategy, which included the 1992 mental health policy and allocated $269 million for implementation.

The Commonwealth Dental Scheme arose out of a 1992 Health Strategy background paper. It provided for free dental care for financially disadvantaged adults from 1994, but was terminated on 1 January 1997 by the Howard government.

Housing and urban policy 
Howe supported an edge-city concept of locational disadvantage, where people on the edge of cities were supposed to be poorer and more disadvantaged than others with better access to services, and commissioned 17 case studies intended to demonstrate this. However the initiative was discontinued when it was shown definitively that the inner cities contained the areas of greatest disadvantage.

The main innovation by Howe in the urban sector was the Building Better Cities Programme (BBC), the first federal venture into urban development since the Whitlam government, and Australia's first submissions-based capital assistance programme. The Commonwealth government supplied $816.4 million over five years for 'demonstration' projects meeting its urban objectives. From 1991, State and local governments could submit capital projects for consideration. The Programme supported projects variously redeveloping inner city precincts, constructing and refurbishing housing, building and upgrading railways and transport interchanges, new light rail systems, new water management infrastructure, as well as developing under-used government land. The incoming Howard government in 1996 discontinued the Programme.

In 1992 Howe initiated Australia's first Housing Strategy, led by Meredith Edwards AM. The Strategy had no effect on housing policy, unlike the Staples Review that preceded it in 1988. It did recommend the establishment of an Australian Housing and Urban Research Institute, which Howe founded in 1993 and which is still operating in 2022.

Later life
Following Howe's departure from parliament, he became Schultz Visiting Professor at the Princeton University. He was then appointed by Melbourne University as a Professorial Fellow in the Centre for Public Policy. He taught postgraduate students, worked on several research projects, authored three books and published many articles.  He organized two major international conferences in Melbourne on changing labour markets and their implications for Australian social policy. He received a visiting fellowship at the Woodrow Wilson School of Public and International Affairs at Princeton University in 1997 and 1998.

In 2012 he chaired the ACTU Independent Inquiry into Insecure Work in Australia. He spoke widely about the issue to the media and addressed the National Press Club.

In 2017 Howe and his wife Renata were the subject of a documentary podcast interview by the Fitzroy History Society Oral History Project covering their early years of activism in the 1960s.

He served on the board of the Brotherhood of St Laurence and the Patrons Council of the Epilepsy Foundation of Victoria. He was a founding director of the Australia and New Zealand School of Government; and was chairman of the Victorian Disability Housing Trust and the community housing association Housing Choices Australia.

Honours
Howe was appointed a Member of the Order of Australia in January 2001, and promoted to Officer level (AO) in January 2008.  He received an Honorary Doctorate from the University of Sydney in 2015.

Publications 
Howe, B (1997). Weighing Up Australian Values: Balancing Transitions and Risks to Work Family in Modern Australia. University of New South Wales Press.

Howe, B and Hughes, P (eds) (2003). Religion in Citizenship and National Life.  ATF Press.

Howe, B and Postma, M (eds) (2002). The Church and the Free Market: Dilemmas in Church Welfare Agencies Accepting Contracts from Government. ATF Press.

Notes

1936 births
Living people
Deputy Prime Ministers of Australia
Australian Labor Party members of the Parliament of Australia
Members of the Cabinet of Australia
Labor Left politicians
Politicians from Melbourne
Uniting Church in Australia ministers
Members of the Australian House of Representatives for Batman
Members of the Australian House of Representatives
Officers of the Order of Australia
20th-century Australian politicians
Government ministers of Australia
Australian Ministers for Health